Brutale may refer to:
 Brutale (DC Comics), a comic book supervillain
 The Sexy Brutale, a 2017 video game
 MV Agusta Brutale series, a series of motorcycles
 Brutale, music band based in Varese Italy.

Brutale was originally formed in 1992 by guitarist/vocalist Piero Verardo, drummer Silvano Colucci and Bassist GG Zanetti.